Brian Kenneth Edgley (26 August 1937 – 18 February 2019) was an English professional footballer who played as an inside forward in the Football League for Shrewsbury Town, Brentford, Cardiff City and Barnsley. He later played in South Africa and Australia and had a 10-year management career in the latter country.

Playing career

Shrewsbury Town 
Edgley began his career at hometown Third Division South club Shrewsbury Town in 1955. He made his first team debut in January 1956 and signed his first professional contract the following month. Having begun his career as a left winger, the Shrews' relegation to the Fourth Division in 1958 saw Edgley break into the team on a regular basis as an inside forward, making 32 appearances and scoring five goals to help propel the club back into the Third Division with a fourth-place finish in the 1958–59 season. He missed just five league games and scored seven goals during the 1959–60 season as Shrewsbury narrowly missed out on a second successive promotion. Edgley departed the club at the end of the season, having made 113 league appearances and scored 12 goals in five years at Gay Meadow.

Cardiff City 
Edgley moved up to the First Division to sign for Cardiff City in a £6,000 deal prior to the start of the 1960–61 season. He had a forgettable season with the Bluebirds, making just 10 league appearances, but his only goal for the club came with a strike in a memorable 3–0 win over Manchester United at Ninian Park on 26 November 1960. He left the club at the end of the season.

Brentford 
Edgley dropped to back to the Third Division to sign for Brentford in June 1961. He scored 12 goals in 33 games during a disastrous 1961–62 season, in which the Bees were relegated to the Fourth Division. Edgley found it difficult to settle at Griffin Park (having failed to relocate from Cardiff to London) and looking for a quick move away, he signed a month-to-month contract at the start of the 1962–63 season. Now behind new signing John Dick in the pecking order, Edgley made just five appearances before departing in November 1962. He made 45 appearances and scored 13 goals during his time with the Bees.

Barnsley 
Edgley joined Third Division club Barnsley in November 1962, but managed just four league appearances for the Tykes.

Non-League football 
After leaving league football, Edgley returned to Wales and played for non-League clubs Merthyr Tydfil and Caernarfon Town.

South Africa 
In 1966 and 1967, Edgley played in South Africa for National Football League clubs Addington, Arcadia United and Cape Town City.

Return to non-League football 
Edgley returned to England in 1968 and made one appearance for Southern League Premier Division club Hereford United in a Welsh Cup semi-final win over Newport County on 23 March 1968. He also had a spell with West Midlands (Regional) League club GKN Sankey.

Australia 
Edgley moved to Australia in 1970 and played for Ringwood City, Mooroolbark United (for whom he top-scored in the 1973 and 1974 seasons) and Balgownie Rangers.

Management career

Caernarfon Town 
Edgley had a short spell as player-manager of Welsh League (North) club Caernarfon Town between June 1965 and January 1966. After his departure, the Canaries went on to win the 1965–66 division title.

Australia 
Edgley had a 10-year management career in Victorian and New South Wales regional football, managing Ringwood City, Balgownie Rangers, Mooroolbark United (two spells), South Melbourne Hellas, Doveton, Frankston City, Essendon Croatia and Preston Makedonia. He won the Victorian Metropolitan League First Division title with Mooroolbark United in 1973, received the Victoria Soccer Coach of the Year award in 1975 and later managed the club in the inaugural National Soccer League season, finishing bottom and suffering relegation back to the regional leagues. Edgley won a Victorian State League and Cup double with Preston Makedonia in the 1980 season.

Personal life 
Edgley attended the Monkmoor Boys' School in Shrewsbury. After his retirement from football, Edgley settled in Melbourne, Australia and became a businessman. After his retirement from business, he and his wife settled on the Mornington Peninsula.

Honours

As a player-manager 
Mooroolbark United
Victorian Metropolitan League First Division: 1973

As a manager 
Preston Makedonia
 Victorian State League: 1980
 Victorian Cup: 1980

As an individual 
 Victorian Soccer Coach of the Year: 1975

Career statistics

References

1937 births
Sportspeople from Shrewsbury
English footballers
Brentford F.C. players
English Football League players
Shrewsbury Town F.C. players
Cardiff City F.C. players
Barnsley F.C. players
Merthyr Tydfil F.C. players
Association football wingers
Association football inside forwards
English expatriate footballers
English expatriate sportspeople in Australia
National Football League (South Africa) players
Caernarfon Town F.C. managers
Caernarfon Town F.C. players
Addington F.C. players
Arcadia Shepherds F.C. players
Cape Town City F.C. (NFL) players
English expatriate sportspeople in South Africa
English expatriate football managers
Southern Football League players
Hereford United F.C. players
GKN Sankey F.C. players
Ringwood City SC players
Ringwood City SC managers
National Premier Leagues managers
Balgownie Rangers FC players
Balgownie Rangers FC managers
Mooroolbark SC players
Mooroolbark SC managers
South Melbourne FC managers
National Soccer League (Australia) coaches
Melbourne Knights FC managers
Preston Lions FC managers
English football managers
2019 deaths